Orange (Orange-Montisel) is a French village and ski resort located in the commune of Saint-Sixt, in the department of Haute-Savoie, Auvergne-Rhône-Alpes. It lies above the commune of La Roche-sur-Foron.

Geography
Orange is located near La Roche-sur-Foron, in the department of Haute-Savoie, at an altitude of 1100–1170 meters. Despite its relatively low altitude, Orange receives a generous amount of snowfall during the winter, partly thanks to its location in the heart of the Plateau des Bornes, which experiences a snowy microclimate.

Activities

Winter sports
Orange is especially known as a site for cross-country skiing. It contains trails categorized as piste verte (easy), piste bleue (moderately difficult) and piste rouge (difficult).

Ski resorts in France